Jade Dajay Bornea (born 2 August 1995) is a Filipino professional boxer who has held the WBC-NABF super-flyweight title since January. As an amateur he represented the Philippines at the Youth World Championships, reaching the semi-finals of the light-flyweight bracket.

Personal life
Bornea was born in Cotabato del Norte, but grew up in General Santos.

Amateur career
Bornea's participation at the 2012 AIBA Youth World Championships ended after he lost  to Murodjon Akhmadaliev of Uzbekistan, 14-25, in the quarter finals of the light flyweight event.

2012 AIBA Youth World Championships

Defeated Dmitrijs Zaharovs (Latvia) PTS 19-6
Defeated Tinko Banabakov (Bulgaria) PTS 19-10
Defeated Jack Bateson (England) PTS 16-12
Lost to  Murodjon Akhmadaliev (Uzbekistan) PTS (14-25)

2013 Asian Confederation Youth Boxing Championships results

Defeated Murodjon Akhmadaliev (Uzbekistan) RSC-3
Defeated Rakhmankul Avatov (Kyrgyzstan) PTS (16-6)
Defeated Shatlykmyrat Myradov (Turkmenistan) (17-10)
Defeated Kosei Tanaka (Japan) PTS (15-13)

Professional career
Bornea made his professional debut against Alberto Muring on 11 October 2014. He won the fight by a fourth-round technical knockout. Borea amassed a 4–0 record before being booked to face Ronnie Sunido for the vacant MinProBA super flyweight title, his first professional belt, on 2 April 2016. He won the fight by a first-round knockout, stopping Sunido with four seconds left in the opening round. Borea fought for his first major regional title, the vacant IBF Youth super-flyweight title, on 26 February 2017, when he faced Raul Yu. He won the fight by unanimous decision, with scores of 98–92, 97–93 and 97–93.

Bornea faced Nicardo Calamba in a non-title bout on 23 July 2017. He won the fight by a second-round knockout. Borea then made his first IBF Youth super flyweight title defense against Samuthra Sitharan on 9 September 2017. He won the fight by a fourth-round technical knockout. Bornea faced John Rey Lauza in another non-title bout on 5 November 2017. He won the fight by a second-round knockout.

Bornea was booked to face Danrick Sumabong for the vacant WBO Oriental Youth super-flyweight title on 28 April 2017. He won the fight by unanimous decision, with scores of 97–93, 96–94 and 96–94. Bornea next faced Alvin Bais on 29 July 2018, and won the fight by a third-round knockout. Bornea faced Macrea Gandionco on 21 October 2018, in his final fight of the year. He won the fight by a fifth-round technical knockout.

Bornea faced Jonathan Francisco on 30 April 2019, in his sole fight of the year. He won the bout by a second-round technical knockout. Bornea faced Ernesto Delgadillo for the vacant WBC-NABF super-flyweight title on 30 January 2020. He won the fight by split decision, with two judges scoring the bout 96–93 in his favor, while the third judge awarded the same scorecard to Delgadillo.

Bornea faced Mohammed Obbadi in an IBF title eliminator on 14 January 2022, at the Auditorio Jacales in Monterrey, Mexico. He won the fight by a third-round knockout, stopping Jacales with an uppercut to the body at the 2:25 minute mark. Bornea was up 39–36, 40–35 and 39–36 on the scorecards at the time of the stoppage.

Professional boxing record

References

External links
 

1995 births
Living people
Sportspeople from General Santos
Light-flyweight boxers
Filipino male boxers
People from Cotabato
Boxers from South Cotabato
21st-century Filipino people